The Rink Hockey American Championship or CSP Copa America is a Rink Hockey competition with the national teams of American countries that happens every four years. It is organized by CSP, South American Federation of Rink Hockey.

The last "Copa America" was held in Vic, Catalonia, and for the first time both men's and women's tournaments were played at the same time and in the same city.

The national teams to participate were:

Men's Results

Tournaments

Medal table

Women Results

Tournaments

Medal table

Next tournaments

The celebration of the 2012 Men's Cup was originally designed to be played in Santiago de Chile, but in the end it was changed to be played in November in the Brazilian city of Recife. One month before the competition, the Catalan Federation announced that the team couldn't play in the Cup because the Catalan government decided not to support the team economically, and at the same time, the Argentinian Federation also announced that they won't be playing either as they were having internal problems. Seeing that the two bigger countries were not coming to the event, the 2012 Men's Cup was disbanded.

The Uruguayan city of Montevideo was selected as host for the 2013 Woman's Cup, but the celebration of that event was not possible for the same problems.

See also
American Championships

External links

 American Federation of Rink Hockey
Copa América 2010 official website
 Man American Championship in Recife
 Woman American Championship in Santiago do Chile
 FIRS Organizational chart
 Confederation Argentina de Patinage
 Confederação Brasileira de Hóquei e Patinação
 The Canadian In-Line & Roller Skating Association
 Federatión Chilena de Hockey y Patinaje
 Federatión Colombiana de Patinaje
 Hockey Mexico
Federación Uruguaya de Patín y Hockey
USA Roller Sports
 Roller Hockey links worldwide
 Mundook-World Roller Hockey
Hardballhock-World Roller Hockey
Inforoller World Roller Hockey
 World Roller Hockey Blog
rink-hockey-news - World Roller Hockey
SoloHockey World Roller Hockey
Rink Hockey in the USA
USARS Hardballhockey Blog

American Championship
Roller hockey competitions
Rink hockey